Monika Denker (born 25 October 1971) is a German former footballer who played as a midfielder. She made seven appearances for the Germany national team from 1994 to 1997.

References

External links
 

1971 births
Living people
German women's footballers
Women's association football midfielders
Germany women's international footballers
Place of birth missing (living people)